Jeffrey or Jeff Cook may refer to:
Jeffrey Cook (British Army officer) (born 1954), Director for Security Liaison in the Royal Household of the Sovereign of the United Kingdom
Jeffrey Cook (cricketer) (born 1972), Anglo-Australian cricketer
Jeff Cook (1949–2022), American musician
Jeff Cook (basketball) (born 1956), retired American professional basketball player
Jeff Cook (English footballer) (born 1953), English former footballer
Jeff Cook (golfer) (born 1961), American golfer
Jeff Cook (lacrosse) (1960–2011), American lacrosse player
Jeff Cook (soccer coach), American soccer coach

See also
Geoff Cook (disambiguation)
Geoff Cooke (disambiguation)